A.O. Poros F.C., short for Athlitikos Omilos Porou (translated Athletic Club of Poros) and also known simply as Poros, is a Greek football club, based in the Póros urban area in Heraklion, Crete. The club was founded in 2012. They currently compete in the Gamma Ethniki, the third tier of the Greek football league system, and host their home games in the Nikos Kazantzakis Stadium, known also as “Martinengo Stadium”.

Honours

Regional
 Heraklion FCA Championship
Winners (1): 2018−19

Players

Current squad

References

Gamma Ethniki clubs

External links

Football clubs in Heraklion
Football clubs in Crete
Association football clubs established in 2012
2012 establishments in Greece